= Russ Hauser =

American physiologist

Russ Hauser is an American physiologist currently the Frederick Lee Hisaw professor of reproductive physiology at Harvard T.H. Chan School of Public Health. He holds Sc.D. (1994) and M.P.H. (1990) degrees from the Harvard School of Public Health. He graduated with a M.D. from the Albert Einstein College of Medicine in 1985.
